Rubricella is a Gram-negative, aerobic and non-motile genus of bacteria from the family of Rhodobacteraceae with one known species (Rubricella aquisinus). Rubricella aquisinus has been isolated from seawater from the Jiaozhou Bay in China.

References

Rhodobacteraceae
Bacteria genera
Monotypic bacteria genera